Nick is a 2021 novel by American writer Michael Farris Smith. It is his sixth novel and was published on January 5, 2021 by Little, Brown and Company. It is a prequel to F. Scott Fitzgerald's landmark 1925 novel The Great Gatsby.

Synopsis 
Nick centers on the narrator of The Great Gatsby, Nick Carraway, in the years before the events of Fitzgerald's novel. It follows Nick Carraway as a soldier in World War I, his detours in Paris, and his time in New Orleans before his move up to Long Island.

Background 

Smith first read The Great Gatsby as a high school student, but he did not fully understand it at the time. In 2014, after living in Europe, Smith reread the novel for the first time in several years. He came to identify with its narrator Nick Carraway and was drawn to Carraway's sense of detachment. He felt emotionally compelled to write a prequel novel, despite the "literary weight" of doing so and the inevitable public reaction. Smith wrote the novel in 2014 and 2015, and did not once take into consideration any potential copyright issues. He wrote it in secret, telling neither his agent nor his editor. In 2015, ten months after Smith began writing the novel, he sent in a completed manuscript. Smith was promptly informed that he would be required to wait until 2021 to publish it due to the original work's existing copyright. The Great Gatsbys U.S. copyright expired on January 1, 2021, when all works published in 1925 entered the public domain in the United States.

Reception 
Kirkus Reviews called Nick a "compelling character study." In his review for The New York Times, Ben Fountain called it an "exemplary novel" with a "classic American sound" and praised Smith's unique rendering of Nick Carraway. Publishers Weekly praised the "striking imagery" of the war chapters, but felt the novel ultimately did not provide any deeper understanding of Nick Carraway. The Los Angeles Times agreed, criticizing the novel as devolving into a melodrama and reprocessing Nick Carraway rather than clarifying his character. Ron Charles of The Washington Post felt the novel failed to expand on the original story and criticized its second half for withdrawing Nick's perspective too far and leaving readers with "noir caricatures and their lurid spat."

References 

2021 American novels
Works based on The Great Gatsby
Prequel novels
Novels based on novels
American historical novels
Little, Brown and Company books
Novels set in Paris
Novels set in New Orleans
Novels set during World War I